Debra Daniel (born 4 March 1991 in Pohnpei) is a Micronesian swimmer. At the 2008 Summer Olympics, she competed in the women's 50 m freestyle, failing to advance beyond the first round.  She competed for Micronesia at the 2012 Summer Olympics and ranked 56th. Daniel did not advance to the semifinals. She also competed in the women's 50 m freestyle at the 2016 Summer Olympics and finished 72nd, again failing to advance.

References

External links
 

1991 births
Living people
People from Pohnpei State
Federated States of Micronesia female swimmers
Swimmers at the 2008 Summer Olympics
Swimmers at the 2012 Summer Olympics
Swimmers at the 2016 Summer Olympics
Olympic swimmers of the Federated States of Micronesia
Federated States of Micronesia female freestyle swimmers
Competitors at the 2013 Summer Universiade